Robb Cobb (born 8 April 1999 in New Zealand) is a New Zealand rugby union player who plays for the  in Super Rugby. He also plays for the Houston  SaberCats in Major League Rugby (MLR). His playing position is prop. 

He has signed for the Chiefs wider training squad in 2020.

Reference list

External links
itsrugby.co.uk profile

1999 births
New Zealand rugby union players
Living people
Rugby union props
Waikato rugby union players
Chiefs (rugby union) players
Houston SaberCats players